"Count Me Out" is a song released as a single by R&B/pop group New Edition from their All for Love album, released in September 1985 on the MCA label.

Much like the group's earliest single, "Cool It Now", again, lead singer Ralph Tresvant is warned by his friends (co-members Bobby Brown, Ronnie DeVoe, Ricky Bell and Michael Bivins) to not fall for a girl after he told them to "count him out" of any activities that they had planned to do much to his friends' dismay.

The song's music video was notable for Brown's absence as he had broken from the group around the time of the video. Only Tresvant, DeVoe, Bell, and Bivins were in the video and parts of the song that originally belonged to Brown were lipsynced by Bell. Brown's vocals remain on the song. Despite a modest showing at number fifty-one on the pop singles chart, the song reached number two on the Billboard R&B singles chart.

New Edition appeared on the TV series Knight Rider performing "Count me Out" on Season 4 Episode 11.

Credits 
 Ronnie DeVoe rap & background vocals
 Bobby Brown lead vocals, rap & background vocals
 Ricky Bell rap & background vocals
 Michael Bivins rap & background vocals
 Ralph Tresvant lead vocals, rap & background vocals

Charts

References

External links
Official video

1985 singles
New Edition songs
1985 songs
MCA Records singles